Third Lanark Athletic Club was a football club based in Glasgow, Scotland founded in 1872. Initially known as 3rd Lanarkshire Rifle Volunteers, they were founder members of the Scottish Football League in 1890, having won the Scottish Cup a year earlier. League champions in 1904, they won the Scottish Cup again in 1905 and spent 58 seasons out of a total of 70 in the top tier, before rapidly declining amidst financial mismanagement and going out of business in 1967.

The following list consists of Third Lanark players who meet at least one of the following criteria:
Played in 100 Scottish Football League matches for the club
Member of squad that won the Scottish League title in 1903–04
Member of team that won the Scottish Cup (1889 and 1905)
Member of team that played on the losing side in a major cup final (1876, 1878, 1906, 1936, 1959)
Member of team that won the Glasgow Cup (1902, 1903, 1908, 1963) or Glasgow Merchants Charity Cup (1890, 1898, 1901, 1952, 1954, 1956)
Played for the Scotland national football team while registered with the club
Played for the Scottish Football League XI while registered with the club

The only player who achieved all of the above was Hughie Wilson, a member of the successful 1900s group – three of his teammates also claimed winner's medals from each of the four trophies available at the time. By contrast, prominent players of later eras like Tommy McInally, Felix Staroscik and Alex Harley did not meet any of the criteria. Goalkeeper Jimmy Brownlie is the club record holder for appearances, Scotland caps and SFL caps, all by some margin. The record goalscorer is Neil Dewar.

For a list of all Third Lanark players with a Wikipedia article, see :Category:Third Lanark A.C. players.

List of players

Position Key

Notes

References

Third Lanark A.C. players
Third Lanark
Players
Association football player non-biographical articles
Players